Grigoriu Ștefănescu (1836–1911) was a Wallachian-born Romanian geologist, mineralogist paleontologist.

Ștefănescu was elected a titular member of the Romanian Academy in 1876. From 1897 to 1898, he served as rector of the University of Bucharest.

Notes

1836 births
1911 deaths
Academic staff of the University of Bucharest
Rectors of the University of Bucharest
Titular members of the Romanian Academy
Romanian geologists
Romanian mineralogists
Romanian paleontologists